Nyarafolo (Niafolo), one of a cluster of languages called Senari, is a Senufo language of Ivory Coast.

References

Senari languages
Languages of Ivory Coast